Rangiahua railway station was a station on the Okaihau Branch in New Zealand. The station was built but the line was closed before any services started operating down the line.

References

Defunct railway stations in New Zealand